Skagit City was a town on the western bank of the South Fork Skagit River, less than a mile southeast of where the river forks north and south, in the U.S. state of Washington. The Barker's Trading Post along the river, opened in 1869, was partially or fully responsible for drawing people to settle at the townsite, which became an important river transportation center during the late 1800s, most notably in 1872. The city prospered until shortly before the 1880s, after river access to the upstream community of Mount Vernon, Washington was established and Mount Vernon began to prosper. By 1906, only one business remained in the entire town, and soon after World War II the town disappeared entirely. Today, the unincorporated community of Cedardale is the closest community to the former townsite at  distance, and the name "Skagit City" has become simply a placename on the northeastern tip of Fir Island near where two distributaries diverge and carry Skagit River water into Skagit Bay, which branches off the Strait of Juan de Fuca. Skagit City is sometimes confused with the nearby tiny hamlet of Skagit Forks, which was just to the northwest at the divergence of the North and South Forks of the Skagit River. The town played an integral part in the settlement of Skagit County.

First settlement
The first white settlement in the Skagit River forks area was in 1868, when a small trading post was established there by a man named John Campbell. The Barker's Trading Post, established by John Barker in 1869, was a trading post near the divergence of the Skagit River into two distributaries named the North Fork and the South Fork. While the South Fork was navigable, the North Fork was the smaller channel that flowed into marshes, estuaries, and sloughs in the northern part of the delta of the Skagit River. This series of logjams was later destroyed, allowing ships to travel further upstream, which also spelled the end for Skagit City. 

Shortly after the settlement of the region began, the first noted murder in the region also occurred, at a point between late 1869 and early 1870. It was said that a group of Native Americans had set up camp on the bank of the North Fork Skagit River directly across from the fledgling town. The only one killed was John Barker, and initial suspicions led to the hanging of two Indians. Later investigations led to suspicion of a nearby resident, Quimby Clark, who fled the area before he could be questioned. Eventually, it was determined that "the store showed plainly that the robbery and murder had been committed by a white man, for things which Indians would have taken were left and those which a white man would have taken were gone."

Notably, Campbell (as previously mentioned the founder of the first trading post along the Skagit forks) once journeyed upriver along the Skagit on an 1874 canoe trip. It was said that one night, he had "slipped off" into the forest across the river. His disappearance went unnoticed until the whole party was awakened by "piercing blood-curling shrieks", and it was later discovered that it was in fact Campbell himself, "shrieking over and over the name of a local Skagit River Indian, 'Ted-auh-an'." The owner of the LaConner hotel, John P. McGlinn, was known to later say that the incidence was a case of "religious dementia". They did not continue upriver, and Campbell was tricked into returning to Skagit City by a false letter by James O'Loughlin, the owner of a tin shop in the settlement.

Peak
In and around its roughly 1872 economic peak, Skagit City provided a sheltered harbor for sternwheelers on trade routes stemming from the city of Seattle and running to smaller settlements in the southern Puget Sound. The  sternwheeler Fanny Lake, which played a key part in the settlement of the Skagit Forks area, as well as Skagit City and the nearby town of LaConner, was the first ship to begin this route, though different sources cite this ship as being either launched in 1874 or having begun the route in 1874, having previously served on different Northwest routes. The ship sank on May 21, 1883, when it hit a riffle in the Skagit River locally known as "Dead Man's Riffle". Although its superstructure was destroyed in the collision, it was refloated in 1889 by Joshua Green and partners, who had founded the La Conner Trading and Transportation Company. Over the next decade, Fanny Lake was responsible for the rapid growth and settlement of the Skagit Forks.

...the wonderfully rapid development of the resources of the river in all its business interests; to say nothing of its extraordinary rapid increase in population, caused by the great number of new settlers, coming into the valley for homes on each trip of the Fanny Lake [Sternwheeler].

<p style="text-align: right;">-The Skagit River Journal, circa 1877

The town was said to be a typical "river town"; a long, narrow settled area stretching along a levee along the Skagit River. Businesses were built facing the river, in a row running along the levee road facing the river. A ferry and many other boats would dock in the extensive harbor of Skagit City, which occupied a wide and deep river channel. At its height, the city had many public buildings among its shops and houses, which included a church, hotels, a school, and a saloon. The aforementioned Fanny Lake was also used for transportation of grains and hay in the Skagit Forks area. In 1893, the Fanny Lake was destroyed for the second and final time when it caught fire and sank in Sullivan Slough.

Decline
The decline of the town of Skagit City began in the 1870s when the two logjams clogging the Skagit River and blocking traffic upstream of the Skagit Forks were removed. The removal of the logs allowed the upstream community of Mount Vernon, Washington to prosper, while Skagit City gradually lost its residents and businesses. The demolition of the logjam, known as the Skagit Jam, began in the fall of 1874 when General Michler of the U.S. Army Corps of Engineers studied the possibility of opening a channel through the logjam. There were also a series of obstacles, presumably including sandbars, submerged rocks, and others, laid out between the two logjams.

Throughout 1877, floods on the Skagit River tearing through the newly excavated channels carried away more and more logs from the slowly dissipating jams. By late 1877, the logjam blocking the mouth of the Skagit River had been entirely destroyed.

It was said that "the older town gradually began to decline, losing its business houses to Mount Vernon one by one." The town slowly faded in importance until, by 1906, only one business remained—a two-story general store owned by Daniel E. Gage, which stayed in business until the early 1910s.

Modern times
Although the town of Skagit City faded in importance as the upriver towns of Mount Vernon and others grew, there was a large influx of settlers to the northern tip of Fir Island in the 1880s and a school in that area became necessary by 1888. Before the old Skagit City school was erected, students had walked to the school in the Fir district to the south or to the Wilbur School on the farm of John Wilbur, or they crossed the river to the Kelly School, named for the pioneer R.L. Kelly and located upslope from the eastern shore of the river on the Peter Egtvet farm.

After the floodwaters of 1887 damaged the Kelly school, the new Skagit County created School District 3 on the east side of the river and Skagit City District 57 School was erected in 1888 on the near present-day Stackpole Road on higher ground a little north of the Kelly School. The new school was close enough to the water that it was undermined by floodwaters in 1901. This led the families to choose a 1/2-acre location on the Knute Lange farm (later known as the Vernal Lee farm) on higher ground west and away from the South Fork. The old Skagit City School still stands there today at 1552 Moore Road; it served the area from 1902-1940 and Ronald Holttum bought the building and property in 1943.

References

External links

Ghost towns in Washington (state)
History of Skagit County, Washington